Tappeh Shir Khan (also Romanized as Tappeh Shīr Khān and Tappeh-ye Shīrkhān) is a village in Beyranvand-e Shomali Rural District, Bayravand District, Khorramabad County, Lorestan Province, Iran. At the 2006 census, its population was 155, in 34 families.

References 

Towns and villages in Khorramabad County